Katie Tallo is a Canadian screenwriter, director, and author.

Early life 
Tallo grew up in Ottawa in the Carleton Heights neighbourhood of Nepean. She is a graduate of Carleton University and Algonquin College.

Career 
Inspired by her time with Women in the Director's Chair (WIDC) in 1997, Tallo developed a scene from her WIDC workshop into her 1998 short film, See Through. Tallo directed the TV-documentary Juiced for CityTV in 1999. Her first feature film, Posers, premiered in 2002. She both wrote and directed the movie. For ten years, Tallo served on the Creative Women Workshops Association (CWWA) Board of Directors.

In 2020, Tallo's debut novel, Dark August, was published by HarperCollins. Dark August was named a New York Times Editor's Pick. Its sequel, Poison Lilies, was published in 2022.

Personal life 
Tallo lives in Ottawa with her husband and daughter. She also had a dog named Levi, whom she depicted in Dark August.

Bibliography 

 Dark August (2020)
 Poison Lilies (2022)

Filmography

Film

Television

References

External links 
 

Canadian women screenwriters
Canadian women novelists
Canadian women film directors
Film directors from Ottawa
Living people
Carleton University alumni
Algonquin College alumni
Writers from Ottawa
21st-century Canadian women writers
Date of birth missing (living people)
Year of birth missing (living people)